Czech Film Critics' Award for Best Documentary is one of the awards given to the best Czech motion picture.

Winners

References

External links

Documentary film awards
Czech Film Critics' Awards
Awards established in 2010